Walope is a small village in Chiplun tehsil in Ratnagiri district in the Indian state of Maharashtra. It is located on the Mumbai-Goa highway in western India. It is 3 km away from Chiplun city. It is near Chiplun railway station.

Facilities
Facilities include water and electricity.

Villages in Ratnagiri district